The 2018 Coppa Italia Final decided the winner of the 2017–18 Coppa Italia, the 71st season of Italy's main football cup. It was played on 9 May 2018 at the Stadio Olimpico in Rome between rivals Juventus and Milan.

Juventus won the match 4–0 with all four goals coming in the second half, winning their fourth consecutive Coppa Italia title and 13th title overall. This was the fifth time these teams met in the Coppa Italia Final, with Juventus winning previously in 1942, 1990 and 2016, and Milan winning in the 1973 final.

Road to the final
Note: In all results below, the score of the finalist is given first (H: home; A: away).

Match

Details

References

Coppa Italia Finals
Coppa Italia Final
Coppa Italia Final 2018
Coppa Italia Final 2018
Coppa Italia Final
Coppa Italia Final 2018
Coppa Italia Final 2018
Coppa Italia Final 2018